The Interlace is a 1,040-unit apartment building complex located at the boundary between Bukit Merah and Queenstown, Singapore. Noteworthy for its break from the typical tower design in cities with high population densities, it resembles Jenga blocks irregularly stacked upon each other. Designed by The Office for Metropolitan Architecture (OMA), it was awarded the World Building of the Year title at the 2015 World Architecture Festival. 

The 170,000 square meters Interlace complex sits on 8 hectares of land, at the corner of Depot Road and Alexandra Road. It has 31 residential blocks with units ranging in size from 800 square feet to 6,300 square feet for the penthouses at the top of each blocks. Recreational facilities include swimming pools, a gym, and tennis courts.

History 
The Interlace's site formerly housed the 607 units Gillman Heights Condominium, which is 50 percent owned by the National University of Singapore (NUS). The property was subsequently sold to CapitaLand through a collective sale but the sale was controversial as NUS held a 16 percent stake in Ankerite, a private fund that was a subsidiary of CapitaLand.

The Interlace was designed by Ole Scheeren and the architecture firm OMA. The project architects who followed the project through to completion while resolving design and compliance issues were RSP Architects Planners & Engineers. The project was commissioned in 2007 and finished in 2013. The property has a 99 year lease from the Singapore government since 2009. The property is surrounded by several parks that are connected and promote the Singapore Green initiative of 2012.

Architecture 

Interlace consists of six storey blocks staggered in a hexagonal arrangements surrounding eight courtyards. The blocks are stacked four high at the center to provide maximum of 24 floors. This provides almost every home with a wide view of the surrounding areas. The courtyards have swimming pools.

Reception 
The architecture community have praised the Interlace. ArchDaily said "incorporates sustainability features through careful environmental analysis of sun, wind, and micro-climate conditions on site and the integration of low-impact passive energy strategies."

The Interlace won the World Building of the Year for 2015. It has been viewed as a challenge to traditional architecture not just in Singapore, but all over the world by CNBC. Geoffrey Montes, writing for Architectural Digest, described the building as "striking residential complex."  Raskin praises Scheeren's design by saying "Architect Ole Scheeren hypothesized that dense urban residential living didn't have to occur in an isolating skyscraper--and he was right". Interlace won the Urban Habitat Award in 2014.

References

External links
 The Interlace at the Büro Ole Scheeren

Residential skyscrapers in Singapore
Residential buildings completed in 2015
Apartment buildings in Singapore
Ole Scheeren buildings